Chris Salmon was Executive Director, Markets at the Bank of England. Between 2011 and 2014 he was Chief Cashier of the Bank of England. The signature of the Chief Cashier appears on British banknotes. Salmon was succeeded as Chief Cashier by Victoria Cleland.

References

External links
Chris Salmon and Victoria Cleland talk about the new-style £50 banknote.

Chief Cashiers of the Bank of England
People associated with the Bank of England
Living people
Year of birth missing (living people)